Varvarin is a town and municipality located in the Rasina District of central Serbia. Population of the town is 2,133, and population of the municipality is 17,772.

History
The town is notable as the site of an 1810 battle during the Russo-Turkish War (1806-1812) between the Ottoman Empire and a combined Russian and Serbian army. A statue to the Russian commander Joseph Cornelius O'Rourke and his men was erected in 1910 on the centenary of their victory in the battle, which freed the city from Turkish domination.

From 1929 to 1941, Varvarin was part of the Morava Banovina of the Kingdom of Yugoslavia.

NATO bombing

During the Kosovo war and the break-up of Yugoslavia in the late 20th century, the area became engulfed in conflict although distant from the border. On a clear Sunday, 30 May 1999, shortly after 1 p.m., a bridge crossing the Velika Morava river in Varvarin was struck by laser-guided bombs fired by one or two low-flying NATO F-16 warplanes conducting attack operations. The area around the bridge was filled with hundreds of people celebrating an Orthodox holiday in and around the nearby church, a market place, and a fairground.

No precautions against air attacks had been taken, as the town is far from Kosovo (approximately 200 km), the aged and narrow bridge was considered insignificant, and no military installations were within a radius of 20 km. Ten civilians were killed and 17 severely injured, in two attack waves a few minutes apart. Most of the casualties occurred in the second wave, when people had rushed to the bridge to help those wounded in the initial wave. Some survivors were left with permanent disabilities,

To this date, NATO has refused to release further details of the airstrike – specifically the nationality of the attacking planes. In a public statement made by NATO spokesman Jamie Shea on 31 May 1999, he declared the Varvarin bridge a legitimate military target. No explanations or other statements have been issued by NATO since then.

The airstrike gave rise to a lawsuit against the German government (one of the NATO countries involved in the conflict). The case was decided against the Serbian plaintiffs, but it is under appeal to Germany's highest court.

Demographics

According to the 2011 census results, the municipality of Varvarin has a population of 17,966 inhabitants.

Ethnic groups
The ethnic composition of the municipality:

Economy
The following table gives a preview of total number of employed people per their core activity (as of 2017):

Twin cities
 Ravne na Koroškem, Slovenia

See also
 List of places in Serbia (N-Z)

References

External links 

 

Populated places in Rasina District
Šumadija
Municipalities and cities of Šumadija and Western Serbia